James Paul Burgess Jr. (born March 9, 1994) is an American football linebacker  who is a free agent. He played college football at Louisville.

His father, James Burgess, also played in the NFL.

Professional career

Miami Dolphins
Burgess signed with the Miami Dolphins as an undrafted free agent on May 6, 2016. On September 3, 2016, he was released by the Dolphins as part of final roster cuts and was signed to the practice squad the next day. He was released on September 13, 2016.

San Diego Chargers
On November 1, 2016, Burgess was signed to the San Diego Chargers' practice squad. He was released on November 14, 2016.

Baltimore Ravens
On November 23, 2016, Burgess was signed to the Baltimore Ravens' practice squad. He was released on November 29, 2016.

Jacksonville Jaguars
On December 7, 2016, Burgess was signed to the Jacksonville Jaguars' practice squad. He was released on December 16, 2016.

Cleveland Browns
On December 20, 2016, Burgess was signed to the Cleveland Browns' practice squad. He signed a reserve/future contract with the Browns on January 2, 2017.

In 2018, Burgess suffered a sprained knee and missed the next two games before returning in Week 6. He suffered a hamstring injury in that game and was waived/injured on October 16, 2018. After clearing waivers, Burgess was placed on injured reserve on October 17, 2018, and was released three days later.

Miami Dolphins (second stint)
On December 4, 2018, Burgess was signed to the Miami Dolphins practice squad. He signed a reserve/future contract with the Dolphins on January 1, 2019. He was waived on May 23, 2019.

New York Jets
On May 28, 2019, the New York Jets claimed Burgess off of waivers. He was waived on August 31, 2019 and was later re-signed to the practice squad. He was promoted to the active roster on October 26, 2019.

On April 2, 2020, Burgess re-signed with the Jets. He was placed on the reserve/COVID-19 list by the team on August 5, 2020. He was activated from the list on August 13. On September 5, 2020, Burgess was waived by the Jets.

Atlanta Falcons
On October 13, 2020, Burgess was signed to the Atlanta Falcons practice squad.

Green Bay Packers
On October 24, 2020, Burgess was signed off the Falcons' practice squad to the Green Bay Packers' active roster. He was placed on injured reserve on November 25, 2020. He was designated to return from injured reserve on January 20, 2021, and began practicing with the team again, but was not activated before the end of the postseason.

San Francisco 49ers
On June 2, 2021, Burgess signed with the San Francisco 49ers. Burgess was waived on August 16, 2021.

NFL career statistics

Regular season

References

External links
Green Bay Packers bio
Georgia Southern Eagles bio

1994 births
Living people
African-American players of American football
American football linebackers
Atlanta Falcons players
Baltimore Ravens players
Cleveland Browns players
Green Bay Packers players
Jacksonville Jaguars players
Louisville Cardinals football players
Miami Dolphins players
New York Jets players
Players of American football from Florida
San Diego Chargers players
San Francisco 49ers players
Sportspeople from Miami-Dade County, Florida
21st-century African-American sportspeople